Blue morpho may refer to several species of distinctly blue butterfly under the genus Morpho, including:
 Morpho achilles (Achilles morpho)
 Morpho cypris (Cypris blue morpho)
 Morpho didius (Didius blue morpho)
 Morpho helenor (Helenor blue morpho)
 Morpho menelaus (Menelaus blue morpho)
 Morpho peleides (Peleides blue morpho)
 Morpho rhetenor (Rhetenor blue morpho)

It may also refer to:
 The Blue Morpho, a character in the animated adventure-comedy series The Venture Bros.

Animal common name disambiguation pages